Ulf Raschke (born 23 July 1972) is a German former professional footballer who played as a striker.

Honours 
 UEFA Cup finalist: 1992–93

References

1972 births
Living people
German footballers
Association football forwards
Borussia Dortmund II players
Borussia Dortmund players
SC Verl players
Rot-Weiss Essen players
FC Gütersloh 2000 players
SV Lippstadt 08 players
Bundesliga players
People from Recklinghausen
Sportspeople from Münster (region)
Footballers from North Rhine-Westphalia
West German footballers